Helmut Heinrich Waldemar Schmidt (23 December 1918 – 10 November 2015) was a German politician and member of the Social Democratic Party of Germany (SPD), who served as the chancellor of West Germany from 1974 to 1982.

Before becoming Chancellor, he served as the minister of defence (1969–1972) and the minister of finance (1972–1974) in the government of Willy Brandt. In the latter role he gained credit for his financial policies. He had also briefly been Minister of Economics and as acting Foreign Minister.

As Chancellor, he focused on international affairs, seeking "political unification of Europe in partnership with the United States" and issuing proposals that led to the NATO Double-Track Decision in 1979 to deploy US Pershing II missiles to Europe. He was an energetic diplomat who sought European co-operation and international economic co-ordination and was the leading force in creating the European Monetary System in 1978. He was re-elected chancellor in 1976 and 1980, but his coalition fell apart in 1982 with the switch by his coalition allies, the Free Democratic Party.

He retired from Parliament in 1986, after clashing with the SPD's left wing, which opposed him on defence and economic issues. In 1986 he was a leading proponent of European monetary union and a European Central Bank.

Background, family, early life and education 

Helmut Schmidt was the elder of two sons of teachers Ludovica Koch (10 November 1890 – 29 November 1968) and Gustav Ludwig Schmidt (18 April 1888 – 26 March 1981) in Barmbek, a working-class district of Hamburg, in 1918. Schmidt studied at Hamburg Lichtwark School, graduating in 1937. Schmidt's father was born the biological son of a German Jewish banker, Ludwig Gumpel, and a Christian waitress, Friederike Wenzel, and then covertly adopted, although this was kept a family secret for many years. This was confirmed publicly by Schmidt in 1984, after Valéry Giscard d'Estaing revealed the fact to journalists, apparently with Schmidt's assent. Schmidt himself was a non-practising Lutheran.

Schmidt was a group leader (Scharführer) in the Hitler Youth organisation until 1936, when he was demoted and sent on leave because of his anti-Nazi views. However, newly accessible documents from 1942 praise his "Impeccable national socialist [Nazi] behaviour", and in 1944 his superiors mentioned that Schmidt "stands the ground of national socialist ideology, knowing that he must pass it on." On 27 June 1942, he married his childhood sweetheart Hannelore "Loki" Glaser (3 March 1919 – 21 October 2010). Schmidt resumed his education in Hamburg after the war, graduating in economics and political science in 1949.

Military service 
Schmidt had planned to study without interruption. Therefore, he volunteered at age 18 for military service in 1937. He began serving with an anti-aircraft battery of Luftwaffe at Vegesack near Bremen.

In World War II, after brief service on the Eastern Front during the invasion of the Soviet Union in 1941 (including the Siege of Leningrad), he returned to Germany in 1942 to work as a trainer and advisor at the Ministry of Aviation. During his service in World War II, Schmidt was awarded the Iron Cross 2nd Class.

He attended the People's Court as a military spectator at some of the show trials for officers involved in the 20 July plot, in which an unsuccessful attempt was made to assassinate Hitler at Rastenburg, and was disgusted by Judge Roland Freisler's conduct.

Toward the end of the war, from December 1944 onwards, he served as an Oberleutnant in the Flak artillery on the Western Front during the Battle of the Bulge and the Ardennes Offensive. He was captured by the British in April 1945 on Lüneburg Heath, and was a prisoner of war until August of that year in Belgium. In 1958 Schmidt was promoted to Hauptmann of the Bundeswehr reserve.

Post-WWII
Schmidt joined the Social Democratic Party of Germany (SPD) in 1946, and from 1947 to 1948 was the leader of the Socialist German Student League, the student organisation of the SPD. Upon graduating from the University of Hamburg, where he read economics, he worked for the government of the city-state of Hamburg, working in the department of Economic Policy. Beginning in 1952, under Karl Schiller, he was a senior figure heading up the Behörde für Wirtschaft und Verkehr (the Hamburg State Ministry for Economy and Transport).

He was elected to the Bundestag in 1953, and in 1957 he became a member of the SPD parliamentary party executive. A vocal critic of conservative government policy, his outspoken rhetoric in parliament earned him the nickname Schmidt-Schnauze ("Schmidt the Lip"). In 1958, he joined the national board of the SPD (Bundesvorstand), and campaigned against nuclear weapons and the equipping of the Bundeswehr with such devices. He alarmed some in his party by taking part in manoeuvres as a reserve officer in the newly formed Bundeswehr. In 1962, he gave up his seat in parliament to concentrate on his tasks in Hamburg.

Senator 

The government of the city-state of Hamburg is known as the Senate of Hamburg, and from 1961 to 1965, Schmidt was the Innensenator: the senator of the interior. He gained a reputation as a Macher (doer) – someone who gets things done regardless of obstacles – by his effective management during the emergency caused by the 1962 flood, during which 300 people drowned. Schmidt used all means at his disposal to alleviate the situation, even when that meant overstepping his legal authority, including employing the federal police and army units (ignoring the German constitution's prohibition on using the army for "internal affairs"; a clause excluding disasters was not added until 1968). Describing his actions, Schmidt said, "I wasn't put in charge of these units – I took charge of them!" He saved a further 1,000 lives and swiftly managed the re-housing of thousands of the homeless.

Return to federal politics 

In 1965, he was re-elected to the Bundestag. In 1967, after the formation of the Grand Coalition between the SPD and the Christian Democratic Union (CDU), he became chairman of the Social Democratic parliamentary party, a post he held until the elections of 1969. In 1968, he was elected deputy party chairman, a post that he held until 1983. Unlike Willy Brandt and Gerhard Schröder, he never became chairman of the party.

In October 1969, he entered the government of Willy Brandt as defense minister. During his term in office, the military conscription time was reduced from 18 to 15 months, while at the same time increasing the number of young men being conscripted. Additionally, Schmidt decided to introduce the Bundeswehr universities in Hamburg and Munich to broaden the academic education of the German officer corps, and the situation of non-commissioned officers was improved. In July 1972, he succeeded Karl Schiller as Minister for Economics and Finance, but in November 1972, he relinquished the Economics department, which was again made a separate ministry. Schmidt remained Minister of Finance and faced the prospect of rising inflation. Shortly before the Oil Shock of 1973, which rattled Britain and United States, Schmidt agreed that European currencies should be floated against the US Dollar. He remained in charge of finance until May 1974.

Chancellor of Germany, 1974–1982 

Schmidt became Chancellor of West Germany on 16 May 1974, after Brandt's resignation in the wake of an espionage scandal. The worldwide economic recession was the main problem his administration faced, and Schmidt took a tough and disciplined line, in reduction of public spending. Schmidt was also active in improving relations with France. Together with the French President Valéry Giscard d'Estaing, he was one of the fathers of the world economic summits, the first of which assembled in 1975. In 1975, he was a signatory of the Helsinki Accords to create the Conference for Security and Co-operation in Europe, the precursor of today's OSCE. In 1978, he helped set up the European Monetary System (EMS), known as the "Snake in the Tunnel".

He remained as Chancellor after the 1976 federal election, in coalition with the liberal Free Democratic Party (FDP). He adopted a tough, uncompromising line with the indigenous Red Army Faction (RAF) extremists. In October 1977, he ordered an anti-terrorist unit of Bundesgrenzschutz policemen to end the Palestinian terrorist hijacking of a Lufthansa aircraft named Landshut, staged to secure the release of imprisoned RAF leaders, after it landed in Mogadishu, Somalia. Three of the four kidnappers were killed during the assault on the plane, but all 86 passengers were rescued unharmed.

Schmidt was re-elected as Chancellor in November 1980. Concerned about the Soviet invasion of Afghanistan, and the Soviet superiority regarding missiles in Central Europe, Schmidt issued proposals resulting in the NATO Double-Track Decision, concerning the deployment of medium-range nuclear missiles in Western Europe, should the Soviets not disarm. This decision was unpopular with the German public. A mass demonstration against the deployment mobilised 400,000 people in October 1981.

At the beginning of his period as chancellor, Schmidt was a proponent of Keynesian economics, and pursued expansionary monetary and fiscal policies during his tenure. Between 1979 and 1982, the Schmidt administration pursued such policies in an effort to reduce unemployment. These were moderately successful, as the fiscal measures introduced after 1977, with reductions in income and wealth taxes and an increase in the medium-term public investment programme, were estimated to have created 160,000 additional jobs in 1978–79, or 300,000 if additional public sector employment was included in the figure. The small reduction in the unemployment rate, however, was achieved at the cost of a larger budget deficit (which rose from 31.2 billion DM to 75.7 billion DM in 1981), brought about by fiscal expansion.

During the 1970s, West Germany was able to weather the global financial storm far better than almost all the other developed countries, with unemployment and inflation kept at comparatively low levels. During the 1976 election campaign, the SPD/FDP coalition was able to win the battle of statistics, whether the figures related to employees' incomes, strikes, unemployment, growth, or public sector debts. Amongst other social improvements, old age pensions had been doubled between 1969 and 1976, and unemployment benefits increased to 68% of previous earnings.

Whilst visiting Saudi Arabia in April 1981, Schmidt made some unguarded remarks about the Israel-Palestine conflict that succeeded in aggravating the delicate relations between Israel and West Germany. Asked by a reporter about the moral aspect of German-Israeli relations, he stated that Israel was not in a position to criticise Germany due to its handling of Palestinians, and "That won't do. And in particular, it won't do for a German living in a divided nation and laying moral claim to the right of self-determination for the German people. One must then recognize the moral claim of the Palestinian people to the right of self-determination." On 3 May, Israeli Prime Minister Menachem Begin denounced Schmidt as "unprincipled, avaricious, heartless, and lacking in human feeling", and stated that he had "willingly served in the German armies that murdered millions." Begin was also upset over remarks that Schmidt had made on West German television the previous week, in which he spoke apologetically about the suffering Germany inflicted on various nations during World War II; but made no mention of the Jews. On his flight home from Riyadh, Schmidt told his advisers that war guilt could not continue to affect Germany's foreign relations.

Schmidt was the first world leader to call upon newly elected French president François Mitterrand, who visited Bonn in July 1981. The two found themselves in "complete agreement" on foreign policy matters and relations with the United States and the Soviet Union, but differed on trade and economic issues.

By the end of his term, however, Schmidt had turned away from deficit spending, due to a deteriorating economic situation, and a number of welfare cuts were carried out, including smaller increases in child benefits and higher unemployment and health contributions. Large sections of the SPD increasingly opposed his security policy, while most of the FDP politicians strongly supported that policy. While representatives of the left-wing of the Social Democratic Party opposed reduction of the state expenditures, the FDP began proposing a monetarist economic policy. In February 1982, Schmidt won a motion of confidence; however on 17 September 1982, the coalition broke apart, with the four FDP ministers leaving his cabinet. Schmidt continued to lead a minority government composed only of SPD members, while the FDP negotiated a coalition with the CDU/CSU. During this time, Schmidt also headed the Ministry of Foreign Affairs. On 1 October 1982, parliament approved a constructive vote of no confidence and elected CDU chairman Helmut Kohl as the new chancellor. This was the only time in the history of the Federal Republic that a chancellor was removed from office in this way.

Domestic reforms 

Although Schmidt did not feel that he was in a position to substantially extend the social reforms of the Brandt Administration, due to the economic problems he encountered during his time as chancellor, a wide range of reforms were nevertheless carried out under his administration. Increases were made to pensions, which went up in numerical terms. Adjusted for changes in the annual price index, pensions went up in real terms. However the rate of pension was not changed in 1978 (even though prices increased by 2.7%), and in 1980 and 1981 the real value of pensions fell by 1.5% and 2.3%, respectively. Improvements were made in family allowances, with monthly subsidies for children increased by over 100% in 1975.

Improvements were made to invalidity and old-age pension provision for the unemployed, who (from 1977 onwards) were technically insured free of charge under the old-age pension and invalidity scheme. Previously, there had only existed partial and restricted coverage for the unemployed. The Law to Improve Occupational Old Age Pensions (1974) extended coverage of occupational pensions, whilst also "co-ordinating them more closely with state pensions and setting minimum standards as regards benefit levels and the preservation of pension rights". By 1976, as a result of this legislation, 65% of private sector employees were covered by occupational schemes, and over two-thirds of these workers were eligible for benefits equal to more than 15% of their earnings at retirement. This legislation also acquired that entitlements to occupational pensions must not expire after leaving a firm, and that occupational pensions must not be reduced as a result of receipt of benefits under the public insurance system. The Social Insurance Law for the Handicapped (1975) extended compulsory coverage to disabled persons working in special establishments for the disabled (medical benefits and cash benefits to replace earnings from work). In 1976, a new declaration of social rights was made, and in 1979, an Act was passed which lowered the pensionable age for severely disabled persons to 61 years, and to 60 years as from 1980.

In October 1974, a Rehabilitation Benefits Alignment Act was passed, with the intention of promoting rehabilitation of the disabled by extending certain benefits to them. To meet the need for more uniform medical treatment in rural areas and on the peripheral of cities due to a lack of panel doctors in those areas, a bill was passed in December 1976 which improved the possibilities of panel doctors' associations by ensuring that panel doctors were available to provide treatment, while also providing for planning according to need and the participation of the sickness insurances. An Act of August 1975 on criminal law reform introduced "other forms of assistance" such as medical advice on contraception, together with assistance pertaining to sterilisation and abortion. New assistance benefits were created in 1975 for family planning and maternity consultations, whilst a constant attendance allowance was increased. Housing renovation and energy savings legislation was introduced in 1977, while a constitutional reform of 1981 increased federal powers in health and education.

In July 1974, special benefits were introduced to compensate for wages not paid as a result of bankruptcy for a maximum of up three months. Increases in income-limits for housing allowances were carried out, together with housing allowance rates, while major improvements were made in welfare provision for the elderly. By 1982, the purchasing power of the average pension was 2.5% better than in 1975. In 1975, tax allowances were replaced by child benefits, while payment for the first child was introduced. A tax relief act reduced income taxes and provided additional tax benefits for housing allowances. The Schmidt administration also introduced social policy legislation in the late 1970s, which increased family allowances (though by a smaller amount than in 1974) and maternity leave benefits. The increases in benefits under the Schmidt administration arguably had a positive impact on reducing inequalities, with the percentage of West Germans living in poverty (according to one measurement) falling between 1978 and 1982.

Under the law of June 1974, the residents could participate in the management of the establishment through a consultative committee. A law of June 1975 amended the Employment Protection Law and the Law on the provision of temporary workers which improved the legal protection of temporary migrants workers in West Germany. A law of December 1975 gave the right to claim under the sickness insurance scheme for medical consultations for family planning purposes. A law of May 1975 extended social security to disabled persons according to various procedures.

Socialist measures for youth and unemployment 
A law of April 1976 on youth employment limited working hours to 40 hours in a 5-day week, raised the minimum working age from 14 to 15, increased leave, improved conditions for release from work for day attendance at vocational training school and for periods of weeks under the block release system, and improved protection at work by restrictions on employment in dangerous or unhealthy work. The general section of the Social Code, which came into effect in January 1976, introduced basic measures concerning the social services. It laid down an obligation to establish the services and institutions needed by the population and to provide them with information and advice on their social rights. These provisions had already had certain effects, in particular a considerable growth in home help services and social centres. A regulation in application of a 1974 law on old people's homes and adult hostels was introduced, according to which compulsory consultative committees could be set up by the residents to ensure their participation in the running of these establishments in a greater measure than in the past. A law passed in August 1974 supplemented the protection provided for disabled people, under a law passed during the Brandt Administration in April 1974, by providing that, henceforth, the benefits for the purposes of medical and occupational rehabilitation would be the same for all the categories of persons concerned: war victims, the sick, the victims of industrial accidents, congenitally disabled persons: a total of about 4 million persons in all.

Various measures were also carried out to mitigate the effects of unemployment. Employment creation schemes were introduced to help young workers. The Training Opportunities Act (1976) helped (over a four-year period) to increase the number of vocational training places from 450,000 to 630,000 a year. In 1976, a provisional law was introduced to boost the number of apprentices, which reduced the numbers of young people out of work. An experimental retraining programme was launched on the shop floor (lasting from 1979 to 1981), which benefited 45,680 people.

A special programme was introduced, specially designed for young people who, because of their poor level of education and language ability, were unable to find a suitable job or training place. The young people were offered a one-year full-time course of training to qualify them for a training place or job, and in September 1980, approximately 15,000 young people were participating in these courses. From 1980 onwards, parents could deduct the cost of day care for their children (in day nurseries and nursery schools in particular) from their taxable income up to an annual maximum of DM 600 or DM 1,200, depending on whether the income of a single parent or that of a married couple was involved. Major additions were also made to the regulations on dangerous substances, while comprehensive new regulations concerning installations requiring supervision were introduced. The Federal Ministry for Youth, Family Affairs and Health gave particular attention to assisting parents in assuming their educational responsibilities towards their children. For instance, special 'letters to parents' were distributed free of charge to parents of children under 8, with some 3 million sent in 1979. A determined effort was also made to provide better education for socially disadvantaged children by supporting pilot schemes and research projects. Public funds had been allocated from 1979 onwards to a pilot scheme entitled 'Aid to children in need' under which children's communities were set up in Berlin and Giitersloh to protect and care for children who had been or were at risk of being ill-treated by their parents, while at the same time the family education and advisory services were assigned the task of educating these parents.

Enshrining constitutional rights for workers 
The Fifth Amendment of July 1979 to the Employment Promotion Law provided, among other measures, for an improvement in conditions governing financial support towards basic vocational training for unemployed young people with at least one year's vocational experience, the expansion of training activities for jobs in which there is a shortage of skilled workers and easier access to further vocational training facilities for problem groups (such as the unskilled, the unemployed, and women generally). In 1979, the Federal Minister for Education and Science made funds available for a new further education establishment to train instructors. Under a law amending the law respecting technical working media and the Industrial Code of August 1979, machines and equipment which had been voluntarily submitted for testing and passed by an established body may bear the marking 'GS' (=safety-tested). For medical equipment, the Federal Minister of Labour and Social Affairs was authorized to issue orders containing further safety provisions, while the resale of hazardous equipment and its display at exhibitions may be prohibited in future by factory inspectors even in the case of trading companies.

Urban housing developments 
The 1976 Act for the Promotion of Urban Development and the 1977 Housing Modernisation Act, together with the 1971 Act for the Promotion of Urban Development passed by the Brandt Administration, enabled most West German cities by the end of the 1970s to introduce programmes aimed at renovating their pre-war residential areas. Additional tax reforms were introduced that lowered the tax burden on low-income households, and which played an important role "in pre-empting a real decline in the income and purchasing power of workers". A law was passed to encourage low-income home ownership, while 250 million marks was provided in 1978 for the promotion of sports and physical education. That same year, entitlement to educational allowances was extended to all tenth-grade pupils in vocational education. In 1979, DM 219 million was set aside for about 80,000 dwellings under the modernisation programme for dwellings worthy of preservation run jointly by the Federal authorities and the individual Lander (50% of this money was earmarked for modernization priority areas). In addition, DM 2,350 million was made available under a five-year programme to improve the housing stock. Loans and higher tax rebates were also used to encourage modernisation of dwellings and energy-saving measures. 577 slum clearance and urban development schemes in 459 municipalities were also accorded financial support amounting to DM 183.5 million, under a law on the promotion of urban development. A law of October 1979 granted a lump-sum allowance for the winter of 1979/80 to help low-income groups to meet the additional outlay incurred by the rise in fuel costs. In August 1979, a programme was adopted for foreign refugees, with resources allocated for aid concerning information, legal advice, psycho-social and medical assistance and for measures to facilitate the integration of refugees or their emigration to other countries. In 1981, DM 340 million were set aside for subsidies and DM 148 million for low-interest loans, which enabled financial assistance to be granted towards the modernization of some 80 000 dwellings.

Industrial compliance standards 
An amendment to a law of September 1980 on air traffic, adopted in January 1981, prohibited the transport of radioactive substances by air without a special permit. Existing safety regulations were considerably extended and modified by the technical committees responsible for individual specialist areas. Regarding installations requiring supervision, the technical regulations for pressure containers (19 January 1982) and steam boilers (26 January 18 March and 8 June 1982) were extended and revised, with their most important provisions concerning the oil- and gas-firing of steam boilers. A Directive on connecting lines designed to carry dangerous fluids (11 June 1982) was issued, together with technical regulations on pressure gases (11 June and 9 July 1982) The existing technical regulations on flammable fluids were also modified and by means of new regulations and directives extended (19 April 1982). Other modifications were made to the technical regulations on high-pressure gas pipelines (22 June and 10 September 1982) and on installations where acetylene is present and calcium carbide is stored (30 September 1982), while new recommended levels for dangerous working substances were incorporated into the regulations governing these substances (10 May 1982).

Workers' pension reform 
The Introductory Tax Reform Law (1974) increased bad weather payments, part-time workers' benefits and insurance benefits to 68% of net wages, fixed special benefits during vocational training at 90% of net earnings, increased assistance benefits to 58% of net earnings, and abolished special family benefits "in favour of the inclusion of the unemployed under general child allowance scheme". A special tax credit was introduced in 1978 in cases of particular financial burden due to children, while a substantial increase in the child allowance was made in 1979. Several policy changes were carried out between 1976 and 1982, such as tax credits and family allowances, which compensated unions for wage restraint and "guaranteed the maintenance of a constant income level for employed persons and their families". Increases were made in child benefits, which rose on a regular basis (particularly for families with more than one child) for most of the years that the Schmidt Administration was in office.

In terms of workplace rights, a "parity" system was introduced (although in a weakened form) on the supervisory boards of all companies employing over 2,000 workers, a reform which West German trade unions had long fought for. This law improved employee representation on the supervisory boards of companies outside the steel and coal industries. The main provision of this new piece of legislation was that in the 650 major companies that accounted for 70% of West Germany's output, employee representation on the supervisory boards rose from one-third to one-half. In 1976, the Young Persons (Protection of Employment) Act was passed, which forbade the employment of children and young persons required to attend full-time education, with minor exceptions.

Product liability and consumer protection 
In June 1974, a reformed food law was passed into law, which aimed to safeguard consumers from physical harm. The Students' Sickness Insurance Law (1975) extended compulsory coverage to students (medical benefits only), while the Artists' Social Insurance Law (1981) introduced compulsory insurance for artists below a certain income-limit. The Detergents Law (1975) and the Effluency Levies Act (1978) were passed to encourage environmental protection. In 1975, the allowable duration of unemployment benefit payment was extended to 24 months during periods of general recession. The 1976 law on standard terms of sale gave consumer groups the right to file suits against companies employing unfair terms of sale. The Higher Education Framework Act of 1976 pronounced that scientific continuing education was a task to be implemented by the institutions of the system of higher education, thus exceeding their traditional tasks of research and lecturing. In 1977, an "investment programme for the future" was decided upon by the Schmidt Administration, which provided DM 16 thousand million for the improvement of the transport system, an efficient and ecological energy supply, provisions for water supply, vocational training, and the safeguarding of the environment.

Societal protection 
The social protection of civil servants and judges (Bund and Lander) was standardised and improved by a law of August 1974. Under a law of May 1976, victims of acts of violence and their survivors would in future have the right to compensation in respect of the physical and economic consequences in the same manner as protection for war victims. In 1977, DM 8 million was made available by the federal government to welfare bodies to build and modernise holiday homes for families. That same year, the conditions for investment in the privately financed construction of rented dwellings were improved by the reintroduction of decreasing depreciation for buildings. In order to take the situation of the unemployed into account to the maximum possible extent in asset formation policy, certain legal provisions were amended so that in the event of unemployment, personal payments could be made to continue savings plans which entailed employers contributions. In addition, workers who had been unemployed for a year or more could unblock savings plans before the end of the freeze without losing the financial benefits offered by the State. A new special programme with funds of DM 100 million was launched at the start of 1978 to improve training and job opportunities for the disabled. The budget of the Federal Labour Office was increased exceptionally by more than 20%, whilst special emphasis was placed on measures to promote vocational training, job creation, advanced training and retraining. The aim was to reduce the high proportion of unemployed persons lacking training and increase the chances of this group to obtain employment.

Under a regulation of December 1976, four new occupational diseases were recognised. To expand training opportunities for girls, a pilot scheme was launched in 1978 to open up certain skilled industrial and technical occupations to them. Laws restricting the access of migrant workers to certain regions were repealed in 1977, and the existing provisions were made more flexible in order to allow the children of migrant workers who had entered the Federal Republic of Germany in 1975/76 access to employment. Legislation governing old people's homes and adult assistance establishments was further supplemented by two regulations, one imposing minimum requirements concerning premises, and the other laying down rules for financial management to ensure that residents were not financially exploited.

Under a law of July 1980, a farmer's surviving spouse wishing to continue working on the farm could obtain a helper or temporary aid from the agricultural pension fund. Any spouse choosing not to do so was entitled to a survivor's allowance if he or she was no longer able to find suitable paid employment either for reasons of age (over 45) or because there were children to bring up. In other cases, the allowance was designed to facilitate reintegration into working life. This allowance guaranteed the spouse protection under the agricultural sickness insurance scheme, which also covered self-employed fishermen and beekeepers.

Divorce reform 
A wide range of social liberal reforms were also carried out during Schmidt's time in office. A marriage and divorce law of 1976 instituted the principle of maintenance obligations of each economically stronger partner, That same year, a reform of naming for partners after marriage was carried out, together with a reform of marriage law, which eliminated "moral guilt" as a criterion for alimony payment obligations. The First Marriage Reform Law of 1976 stated that pension entitlements acquired during marriage must be shared with the economically weaker spouse following divorce. In 1977, a law was introduced which enabled married women to enter employment without the permission of their husbands, while prison reforms guaranteed inmates access to courts for any violations of their rights, limited sentences in all but the gravest cases to 15 years, and proclaimed rehabilitation to be the objective of incarceration. In 1977, a Sex Discrimination Act was passed. In 1981, a legal aid system was established to facilitate access to courts of law.

Implications for a socialist Europe 
An amendment to the legal code for residency permits was made in 1978, which granted foreign residents the right to unlimited residence permits after five years of continuous residency. The amendment also stated that legal residents would be eligible for a residence entitlement after eight years if certain conditions were met, such as language fluency. In 1979, paid parental leave was extended from 2 to 6 months, while the European directive on equal treatment for women in paid employment was adopted that same year. The Maintenance Security Law of 1979 introduced public advance payments for single parents "not in receipt of maintenance payments from the liable parent". These benefits were made payable up to 36 months, and private claims against a parent not meeting a maintenance liability were taken over by the state. In that same year, four months paid parental leave were introduced for working mothers, while job-protected leave after childbirth was increased from 8 weeks to 6 months. In 1980, a "compliance law" was passed that covered discrimination in hiring, promotion and dismissal, and measures to promote equal pay.

Life after politics 

In 1982, along with his friend Gerald Ford, he co-founded the annual AEI World Forum. The following year he joined the nationwide weekly Die Zeit newspaper as co-publisher, also acting as its director from 1985 to 1989. In 1985, he became managing director. With Takeo Fukuda he founded the Inter Action Councils in 1983. He retired from the Bundestag in 1986. In December 1986, he was one of the founders of the committee supporting the EMU and the creation of the European Central Bank.

Contrary to the line of his party, Schmidt was a determined opponent of Turkey's bid to join the EU. He also opposed phasing out nuclear energy, something that the Red-Green coalition of Gerhard Schröder supported. In 2007, Schmidt described the climate debate as "hysterically overheated". When asked about social media, Schmidt said he perceived the internet as "threatening". He was particularly concerned about the superficiality of communication on the web.

On 16 May 2014, Schmidt said the Russo-Ukrainian War was dangerous, because, "Europe, the Americans and also Russia are behaving in a way that Christopher Clark, described in his book The Sleepwalkers: How Europe Went to War in 1914 that's very much worth reading, as the beginning of World War I: like sleepwalkers." Clark later disputed comparisons between the Russo-Ukrainian War and World War I, saying in 2022, "The first world war began in an incredibly complex, around-the-houses way. Whereas in the case of the invasion of Ukraine, in 2014 and this year, it’s quite clearly a case of the breach of the peace by just one power."

Schmidt was the author of numerous books on his political life, on foreign policy, and political ethics. He made appearances in numerous television talk shows, and remained one of the most renowned political publicists in Germany until his death.

In his later years, Schmidt gained a positive reputation as an elder statesman across party lines in Germany.

Friendships 

Schmidt described the assassinated Egyptian president Anwar Sadat as one of his friends from the world of politics, and maintained a friendship with ex-president Valéry Giscard d'Estaing of France. His circle also included former Singapore Prime Minister Lee Kuan Yew and former U.S. Secretaries of State George Shultz and Henry Kissinger. Kissinger went on record as stating that he wished to predecease Helmut Schmidt, because he would not wish to live in a world without him.

He was also good friends with former Canadian Prime Minister Pierre Trudeau. At the 4th G7 summit in 1978, the two discussed strategies for the upcoming Canadian federal election, and Schmidt gave him advice on economic policy. In 2011, Schmidt made a pilgrimage to the Trudeau family vault in St-Rémi-de-Napierville Cemetery, accompanied by Jean Chrétien and Tom Axworthy.

Personal life 
Schmidt admired the philosopher Karl Popper, and contributed a foreword to the 1982 Festschrift in Popper's honor.

Schmidt was a talented pianist, and recorded piano concertos of both Mozart and Bach with German pianist and conductor Christoph Eschenbach. Schmidt recorded Mozart's piano concerto for three pianos, K. 242, with the London Philharmonic Orchestra directed by Eschenbach in 1982 with pianists Eschenbach and Justus Frantz for EMI Records (CDC 7 47473 2). In that recording, according to the CDs liner notes, Schmidt played the part written for Countess Antonia Lodron's youngest daughter Giuseppina, "almost a beginner" who commissioned the work. The part brilliantly "enables any reasonably practiced amateur to participate in a performance". The same musical notes also indicate that Schmidt and Frantz had played duets during Frantz's student days. In 1990 Schmidt joined Eschenbach, Frantz, Gerhard Oppitz and the Hamburg Philharmonic Orchestra in Deutsche Grammophon's recording of Bach's Concerto in A minor for four harpsichords, BWV 1065.

All his adult life, Schmidt was a heavy smoker. He was well known for lighting up during TV interviews and talk shows. On 13 October 1981, Schmidt was fitted with a cardiac pacemaker.

On 25 January 2008, German police launched an inquiry after an anti-smoking initiative charged that Schmidt was defying the recently introduced smoking ban. The initiative claimed that Schmidt had been flagrantly ignoring anti-smoking laws. Despite pictures in the press, the case was subsequently dropped after the public prosecutor's office ruled that Schmidt's actions had not been a threat to public health.

On 6 April 2010, with a lifespan of 33,342 days, he surpassed Konrad Adenauer in terms of longevity, and at the time of his death was the oldest former chancellor in German history.

His wife of 68 years, Loki Schmidt, died on 21 October 2010, aged 91.

At the beginning of August 2012, Schmidt gave an interview on German television and revealed that at 93 years of age, he had fallen in love again. His new life-partner was his associate of over 57 years, Ruth Loah (27 September 1933 – 23 February 2017).

Illness, death and state funeral 

On 2 September 2015, Schmidt underwent surgery for a vascular occlusion in his right leg. On 17 September, he was discharged from hospital. After initial improvement, his condition worsened again on 9 November, with his doctor saying he "feared for the worst". Schmidt died in his Hamburg home on the afternoon of 10 November 2015, aged 96. At the time of his death, he was the longest-lived German Chancellor.

A state funeral for Schmidt was held on 23 November at the Protestant (Lutheran) St. Michael's Church, Hamburg, where Loki Schmidt's funeral had been held. German Chancellor Angela Merkel, in remarks to mourners, said, "He will be missed. He was an astute observer and commentator, and it was with good reason that he had a reputation for dependability." Others who spoke included former U.S. Secretary of State Henry Kissinger. Speaking in German, he lauded Schmidt for "vision and courage", based on the principles of "reason, law, peace and faith", and said Schmidt had been "a kind of world conscience".

Among the 1,800 who attended were German President Joachim Gauck, former U.S. Secretary of State Henry Kissinger and former French President Valéry Giscard d'Estaing, whose tenure in office paralleled Schmidt's as German chancellor. Other guests included former chancellor Gerhard Schröder, former presidents Christian Wulff, Horst Köhler, Roman Herzog and Hamburg's mayor Olaf Scholz. A flag-draped coffin containing the remains of the former chancellor, also a former German defense minister, was escorted by the German Army's Wachbataillon from St. Michael's to Ohlsdorf Cemetery for a private interment ceremony. Helmut Schmidt's remains were buried there one day later, in the family grave alongside the remains of his parents and his wife, Loki.

Honours and awards 
Helmut Schmidt received a number of accolades. Among those offered was the Grand Cross Order of Merit of the Federal Republic of Germany, which he chose not to accept in Hanseatic tradition in line with the history of independence of Hamburg.

In 2003, the university of Germany's federal armed forces in Hamburg was renamed Helmut Schmidt University – University of the Federal Armed Forces Hamburg in 2003, in honour of the politician whoas minister of defensehad introduced mandatory academic education for German career officers.

Freedom of the City 
 1983: Hamburg
 1983: Bonn
 1983: Bremerhaven
 1989: Berlin
 1995: Güstrow
 1998: State of Schleswig-Holstein

Honorary degrees 
Throughout his tenure as chancellor, and even thereafter, Helmut Schmidt received 24 honorary degrees. They include degrees from the British universities Oxford and Cambridge, Paris Sorbonne, the American Harvard and Johns Hopkins universities, the Belgian Katholieke Universiteit Leuven, and the Keio University in Japan.

Foundations 
The Bundeskanzler-Helmut-Schmidt-Stiftung was established in 2016 by the German Bundestag as one of six non-partisan foundations commemorating politicians. Its aim is to honour Helmut Schmidt's historic achievements and to work on political issues Helmut Schmidt was concerned with throughout his political life and which have lost none of their relevance today. The foundation's headquarters are located in Hamburg.

Awards 
 1978: Theodor Heuss Prize for his crisis management in the time of RAF-Terror
 1978: Peace Prize of the Louise Weiss Foundation in Strasbourg
 1986: Athena Award of the Alexander S. Onassis Foundation
 1988: Red Cross Four Freedoms Award
 1989: Prize "The Political Book" award of the Friedrich Ebert Foundation for Men and Powers
 1990: Friedrich-Schiedel-Literaturpreis for Men and Powers
 1996: Spanish journalism prize Godo
 1998: Carlo Schmid-Prize
 2001: Gold Medal of the Foundation Jean Monnet, for his dedication in the service of the European Monetary Union (together with his friend, the former French President Valéry Giscard d'Estaing)
 2002: Martin Buber-Plaque
 2002: Dolf Sternberger-Prize
 2005: Prix des Generations of the initiative VIVA 50plus
 2005: Oswald von Nell-Breuning-Prize of the city of Trier
 2005: Adenauer-de Gaulle Prize, for his work at the Franco-German cooperation (along with Valéry Giscard d'Estaing)
 2007: Henry Kissinger Prize of the American Academy in Berlin
 2007: Global Economy Prize of the Kiel Institute for the World Economy
 2008: Osgar Media Award of the Bild Zeitung
 2009: Felix Mendelssohn Bartholdy Prize
 2010: Point-Alpha-Prize
 2010: Henri-Nannen-Prize for his journalistic lifetime achievement
 2011: Millennium-Bambi
 2012: Eric M. Warburg Prize
 2012: Westphalian Peace Prize
 2013: Hanns Martin Schleyer Prize. The Schleyer family's decision to award him this prize 36 years after Schleyer's death deeply moved him.
 2014: German-French Journalists Prize
 2015: Gustav-Stresemann-Prize of the Grand Lodge of Ancient Free and Accepted Masons of Germany

Controversies over service in World War II 
In 2017, after Minister of Defense Ursula von der Leyen issued an order to remove Wehrmacht memorabilia from barracks and other institutions of the Bundeswehr, a photo of the young Lieutenant Helmut Schmidt in Wehrmacht uniform was removed from the military's Helmut Schmidt University in Hamburg. Although the photo is now displayed again, the initial decision has caused a debate over Schmidt's service in the Wehrmacht. According to Der Spiegel, von der Leyen initially distanced herself from this decision, yet after a few days, she explained that Schmidt, as Minister of Defense and later Chancellor, was important in the formation of the Bundeswehr as a democratic army, but his time in the Wehrmacht had nothing to do with this. Historian Michael Wolffsohn argues that Schmidt avoided explaining about what he had done between 1940 and 1945." He further comments that the whole Schmidt affair reveals that while the Bundeswehr is not "a state within state", there is an uncritical milieu in the Bundeswehr that does not correspond to the spirit of the majority in the German society and might get larger if unchecked. He recommends that the photo be displayed again, but with explanations. Theo Sommer, a prominent journalist and former Chief of Planning Staff for the Ministry of Defence, while agreeing that the military leadership should pay attention to extremism within the Bundeswehr, criticizes von der Leyen for her overreaction and Wolffsohn for false representation of Schmidt's attitude. According to Sommer, Schmidt had always been frank about his service on the Eastern Front: while he denied that he had ever seen or known about mass extermination of Jews in Russia, Schmidt admitted he often had to shoot at villages and then recognized the smell of burnt flesh. Schmidt said the troops were never taught about the Geneva Conventions, and by standards of today, he would have to go to court "a dozen times". According to Der Spiegel, Schmidt dated his departure from "idea and practice of National Socialism" to 1942 and his recognition of the criminal character of the regime to 1944.

Books

Memoirs 

 Menschen und Mächte (Men and Powers), Siedler, Berlin 1987. Memoirs with focus on cold war politics.
 Die Deutschen und ihre Nachbarn (The Germans and Their Neighbours), Siedler, Berlin 1990. Strong focus on European politics.
 Kindheit und Jugend unter Hitler, with Willi Berkhan et al. (Childhood and Youth Under Hitler). Siedler, Berlin 1992.
 Weggefährten (Companions), Siedler, Berin 1996. Personal memoirs, with focus on personal relations with domestic and foreign politicians

Political books (selection)

Notes and references

Explanatory notes

Citations

Further reading 
 Bark, Dennis L., and David R. Gress. Democracy and Its Discontents 1963–1988 (A History of West Germany) (v. 2) (1989)

 Dönhoff, Marion. Foe into Friend: Makers of the New Germany from Konrad Adenauer to Helmut Schmidt (1982)
 Merkl, Peter H. The Federal Republic of Germany at Forty: Union Without Unity (1989)
 Soell, Hartmut. Helmut Schmidt: Pioneer of International Economic and Financial Cooperation (2013) excerpt
 Spohr, Kristina. The Global Chancellor: Helmut Schmidt and the Reshaping of the International Order (Oxford University Press, 2016).
 Wilsford, David, ed. Political Leaders of Contemporary Western Europe: A Biographical Dictionary (Greenwood, 1995) pp. 405–13.

External links 

Biography at the German Historic Museum 
Chancellor Site 
Helmut Schmidt University

Talks:
Kröten und Paragrafenwahn (German, 2006)
Schmidt's talk on the occasion of China's Prime Minister Wen Jiabao visiting Hamburg (English, 2006)
Interview on nuclear strategy in Europe for the WGBH series, War and Peace in the Nuclear Age
Interviews:
A Talk with Helmut Schmidt, The New York Times, 16 September 1984

 
1918 births
2015 deaths
20th-century Chancellors of Germany
Chancellors of Germany
Defence ministers of Germany
Economy ministers of Germany
Finance ministers of Germany
Politicians from Hamburg
German Christian socialists
German economists
German Lutherans
German people of Jewish descent
Luftwaffe personnel of World War II
Lutheran socialists
Members of the Bundestag for Hamburg
Members of the Bundestag 1983–1987
Members of the Bundestag 1980–1983
Members of the Bundestag 1976–1980
Members of the Bundestag 1972–1976
Members of the Bundestag 1969–1972
Members of the Bundestag 1965–1969
Members of the Bundestag 1961–1965
Members of the Bundestag 1957–1961
Members of the Bundestag 1953–1957
People of the Cold War
Recipients of the Iron Cross (1939), 1st class
Senators of Hamburg
Sozialistischer Deutscher Studentenbund members
University of Hamburg alumni
German prisoners of war in World War II held by the United Kingdom
Burials at the Ohlsdorf Cemetery
Recipients of the Four Freedoms Award
Members of the Bundestag for the Social Democratic Party of Germany
Hitler Youth members
German military personnel of the Bundeswehr